Kingsley is an English surname. Written in Old English as Cyningesleah, this locational surname roughly means "from the king's wood, glade or meadow," and derives from the Old English words Cyning (King) and leah (woodland clearing).

People with the surname "Kingsley" include

A
Adam Kingsley (born 1975), Australian rules footballer
Alois Kingsley (born 1969), Papua New Guinean politician
Anna Kingsley (1793–1870), American slave
Atta Boafo Daniel Kingsley, Ghanaian politician

B
Ben Kingsley (born 1943), English actor
Benjamin Naka-Hasebe Kingsley, Indigenous American writer
Bob Kingsley (1939–2019), American radio personality
Burton L. Kingsley (1879–1944), American businessman and politician

C
Calvin Kingsley (1812–1870), American bishop
Charles Kingsley (1819–1875), English novelist
Charles Kingsley (tennis) (1899–1996), English tennis player

D
David R. Kingsley (1918–1944), American air force officer
Dorothy Kingsley (1909–1997), American screenwriter

E
Eleta Kingsley (born 1989), Nigerian footballer
Elizabeth Kingsley (1871–1957), American puzzle constructor
Emily Kingsley (born 1940), American writer
E. T. Kingsley (1856–1929), Canadian politician
Ezeali Kingsley (born 1993), Nigerian footballer

F
Ferdinand Kingsley (born 1988), English actor and musician
Florence Morse Kingsley (1859–1937), American author

G
George Kingsley (1826–1892), English physician
Gershon Kingsley (1922–2019), German-American composer
Grace Kingsley (1873–1962), American columnist
Gregory Kingsley (born 1980), American social figure

H
Harold Kingsley (1885–1970), English soldier
Harvey R. Kingsley (1871–1936), American politician
Henry Kingsley (1830–1876), English novelist
Henry Coit Kingsley (1815–1886), American lawyer

J
James Kingsley (1797–1878), American politician
James Luce Kingsley (1778–1852), American biblical scholar
Jason Kingsley (disambiguation), multiple people
Jean-Pierre Kingsley (born 1943), Canadian civil servant
Jenna Kingsley (born 1992), Australian footballer
John Sterling Kingsley (1854–1929), American professor

K
Katherine Kingsley (born 1981), English actress
Kaza Kingsley, American author
Kent Kingsley (born 1978), Australian rules footballer

M
Mary Kingsley (1862–1900), English writer and explorer
Matt Kingsley (1874–1960), English footballer
Matt Kingsley (basketball) (born 1986), American basketball player
Mike Kingsley (born 1959), American politician
Moses Kingsley (born 1994), Nigerian basketball player

N
Norman William Kingsley (1829–1913), American dentist

P
Patrick Kingsley (1908–1999), English cricketer
Patrick Kingsley (journalist) (born 1989), British journalist
Peter Kingsley (born 1953), English author

R
Redin Kingsley, Indian actor
Robert Kingsley (1903–1988), American legal scholar

S
Sidney Kingsley (1906–1995), American dramatist
Stella Kingsley (born 2002), Nigerian weightlifter
Stephen Kingsley (born 1994), Scottish footballer
Stuart Kingsley (born 1948), British scientist
Sunny Ekeh Kingsley (born 1981), Nigerian footballer
Susan Kingsley (1946–1984), American actress

U
Ugonna Kingsley (born 2004), Nigerian basketball player

W
William Kingsley (??–1619), English priest
William C. Kingsley (1833–1885), American construction contractor

Z
Zach Kingsley (born 1980), American soccer player
Zephaniah Kingsley (1765–1843), English slave trader
Zephaniah Kingsley Sr. (1734–1792), British merchant and planter

Fictional characters
Roderick Kingsley, a character in the comic book series Marvel Comics
Tamara Kingsley, a character on the soap opera Home and Away

See also
Kingsley (disambiguation), a disambiguation page for "Kingsley"
Kingsley (given name), a page for people with the given name "Kingsley"

References